Egejuru Godslove (born December 4, 1986 in Lagos) is a Nigerian footballer  who currently plays for Dunaújváros PASE.

External links
 Player profile at HLSZ 

1986 births
Living people
Sportspeople from Lagos
Nigerian footballers
Association football forwards
Kaposvölgye VSC footballers
Kaposvári Rákóczi FC players
Pécsi MFC players
Kozármisleny SE footballers
Dunaújváros PASE players
Nemzeti Bajnokság I players
Nigerian expatriate footballers
Expatriate footballers in Hungary
Nigerian expatriate sportspeople in Hungary